Paracontias is a genus of skinks, lizards in the family Scincidae. The genus is endemic to Madagascar.

Taxonomy and systematics
Paracontias is usually placed in the subfamily Scincinae, which seems to be paraphyletic however. Probably quite close to Amphiglossus and possibly Androngo trivittatus, it belongs to a major clade which does not seem to include the type genus Scincus. Thus, it will probably be eventually assigned to a new, yet-to-be-named subfamily. (Austin & Arnold 2006)

Species
The following 14 species are recognized as being valid.
Paracontias ampijoroensis 
Paracontias brocchii  – stone skink
Paracontias fasika 
Paracontias hafa 
Paracontias hildebrandti  – Hildebrand's skink 
Paracontias holomelas  – Anzahamaru skink
Paracontias kankana 
Paracontias mahamavo 
Paracontias manify 
Paracontias milloti  – Nosy Mamoko skink
Paracontias minimus 
Paracontias rothschildi  – Rothschild's skink
Paracontias tsararano 
Paracontias vermisaurus 

Nota bene: A binomial authority in parentheses indicates that the species was originally described in a genus other than Paracontias.

References

Further reading
 (2006). "Using ancient and recent DNA to explore relationships of extinct and endangered Leiolopisma skinks (Reptilia: Scincidae) in the Mascarene islands". Molecular Phylogenetics and Evolution 39 (2): 503–511.  (HTML abstract)
 (1894). "Reptiles nouveaux ou insuffisamment connus de Madagascar ". Compte Rendu Sommaire des Séances de la Société Philomatique de Paris 17: 1–8. (Paracontias, new genus, p. 3). (in French).

Paracontias
Lizard genera
Taxa named by François Mocquard